The Servoplant Aerocraft is a Romanian agricultural ultralight biplane, designed and produced by agricultural machinery manufacturer Servoplant, of Bucharest. The aircraft is supplied as a kit for amateur construction or as a complete ready-to-fly-aircraft.

Design and development
The aircraft complies with the Fédération Aéronautique Internationale microlight rules. It features a strut-braced biplane layout, a two-seats-in-tandem open cockpit, fixed tricycle landing gear and a single engine in pusher configuration. The aircraft can also be fitted with floats for water operations.

The Aerocraft is made with a composite fuselage and aluminum wings. The standard engine is the  Subaru EA81 automotive four-stroke powerplant.

Operational history
In Romania the Aerocraft's popularity for agricultural aerial application is greater than that of the Antonov An-2.

Specifications (Aerocraft)

References

External links

Official website archives on Archive.org
Photo of a Servoplant Aerocraft
Photo of a Servoplant Aerocraft

1990s Romanian ultralight aircraft
Homebuilt aircraft
Single-engined pusher aircraft